Birgi Grand Mosque, also called "Aydınoğlu Mehmet Bey Mosque", is a historical mosque in Turkey.

Aydınids was an Anatolian beylik ( principality ) in the 14th century in West Anatolia. Birgi, now a village was the capital of the beylik. The mosque was commissioned by Mehmet, the first ruler of the beylik.

Architecture
The mosque was built in 1312. It is an example of a typical Seljukid mosque. The most notable sections of the mosque are the fine woodworking mimbar which has no metallic nail  and the mihrab which is made of dark cyan marble. The lion statue in the south eastern corner of the building is also interesting for statues are rare in Islamic architecture and this statue is a spolia from a Lydian building.

Mimbar gate theft
In 1993 the gate of the mimbar disappeared and it was discovered by a British tourist in British Museum. The Ministry of Culture and Tourism purchased the gate and in 1996 it returned to where it belongs.

References

Buildings and structures in İzmir Province
Ödemiş District
Mosques completed in 1312
Mosques in Turkey
Birgi